The 12th Aerobic Gymnastics European Championships took place in Pesaro, Italy from September 17 to 19, 2021.

Medals

Medal table

Medalists

References

External links
Official website

2021 in gymnastics
2021 in Italian sport
Aerobic Gymnastics European Championships
International gymnastics competitions hosted by Italy
Gymnastics, Aerobic
European Aerobic Gymnastics Championships